Bogue Chitto  is an unincorporated community and census-designated place (CDP) in Lincoln County, Mississippi, United States. As of the 2020 census, it had a population of 437. Bogue Chitto is the only municipal hamlet in the state of Mississippi.

History 
Bogue Chitto takes its name from the nearby Bogue Chitto River, the name of which is a Choctaw word, Bok Chito, meaning "big river".

The population in 1900 was 582.  At that time, the settlement had telephone and telegraph services, a school, and several churches. The local economy involved the lumber industry, and a lumber mill and cotton gin were located there.

The settlement is located on a branch of the Illinois Central Railroad.

Geography 
Bogue Chitto is in southern Lincoln County, west of the Bogue Chitto River and east of Interstate 55, which provides access to the town at Exit 30 (Bogue Chitto Road). I-55 leads north  to Jackson, the state capital, and south the same distance to Hammond, Louisiana. U.S. Route 51 runs through the community, just west of the center of town and parallel to I-55. US 51 leads north  to Brookhaven, the Lincoln county seat, and south  to McComb.

The Bogue Chitto River flows south past the community, then southeast into Louisiana, where it joins the Pearl River.

Demographics 

As of the 2020 United States census, there were 437 people, 110 households, and 80 families residing in the CDP.

Education 
Bogue Chitto is part of the Lincoln County School District. The Bogue Chitto Attendance Center serves area students in grades K-12. The community's first school was built in 1924. The original Art Deco-style building was demolished in 2003 by Jackson Salvage Company.

References 

Unincorporated communities in Mississippi
Unincorporated communities in Lincoln County, Mississippi
Census-designated places in Mississippi
Census-designated places in Lincoln County, Mississippi
Mississippi placenames of Native American origin